John Charles Armitt (23 August 1925 – 4 June 2008) was a wrestler from New Zealand.

He competed at the 1950 British Empire Games where he won the gold medal in the men's 62 kg grade. At the next British Empire and Commonwealth Games in Vancouver he won the bronze medal in the same event.

References

1925 births
2008 deaths
Commonwealth Games gold medallists for New Zealand
Commonwealth Games bronze medallists for New Zealand
Wrestlers at the 1950 British Empire Games
Wrestlers at the 1954 British Empire and Commonwealth Games
New Zealand male sport wrestlers
Commonwealth Games medallists in wrestling
Medallists at the 1950 British Empire Games
Medallists at the 1954 British Empire and Commonwealth Games